Chedi Phukhao Thong is a 50-metre

chedi, or Buddhist tower, in the village of Phukhao Thong near Ayutthaya in central Thailand. Visitors can climb as far a landing halfway up the chedi, from which the surrounding rice fields and the town of Ayutthaya can be seen. In 2014 it was possible for the public to visit the shrine inside the central tower.

History
In 1569, having taken Ayutthaya, King Bayinnaung of Hongsawadi (now part of Myanmar) built a large chedi, next to the Buddhist temple of Wat Phukhao Thong, to commemorate his victory. The chedi was never completed, only the base was ever constructed when in 1587, Prince Naresuan, to commemorate his victory over the Burmese in 1584 following Ayutthaya's liberation from Burma, decided to build a Thai-style chedi over the base of the still-unfinished chedi. Over the next two centuries the chedi fell into disrepair. In a restoration during the reign of King Boromakot (ruled 1733–1758) a new chedi in Thai style, having a square plan with indented corners, was built on the base of the ruin.

The adjacent temple, founded by King Ramesuan in 1387, is still in use.

References

Buddhist temples in Phra Nakhon Si Ayutthaya Province
Buildings and structures in Phra Nakhon Si Ayutthaya province